Gudivakavaripalem is a small village located in Avanigaddda mandal, Krishna District, Andhra Pradesh, India. It consists of 400 people in which the majority depend on agriculture for their livelihood.

The pincode of Gudivakavaripalem is 521122.

References

https://www.wikivillage.in/pincode/gudivakavaripalem-pincode-521122/

Villages in Krishna district